Remaldo Rose (born 18 November 1987) is a Jamaican sprinter who specializes in the 100 metres.

Rose went to Camperdown High School in September 2000, but was injured in his early years. His performances improved in 2003 and he broke the VMBS Boys and Girls Athletic Championship Class 2 100 m record three times consecutively in the heats, semis and final. He also took the Class 2 200 m title that year and went on to win the 100 m and 200 m Class 1 titles in his first year. He helped his team to many relay victories, including the  relay which the school had not entered for a number of years. The Camperdown team also won at the Penn Relays, and he was selected for the junior international relay team.

At the 2004 World Junior Championships in Athletics he won the bronze medal in the 100 m and anchored the junior relay team to the silver medal behind the United States. He returned at the 2006 World Junior Championships in Athletics and (along with Yohan Blake) helped the 4×100 m relay team to the world junior gold medal. He was beaten the 100 m bronze medal by Blake, having finished in fourth place. He won the 100 m title at the 2006 CARIFTA Games.

Injuries abruptly interrupted his career at that point and it was not until 2010 that he was able to assert himself within the senior ranks. He ran at the Amsterdam Open meeting in August and was selected as a relay runner for Jamaica at the 2010 Commonwealth Games. He achieved a personal best of 10.20 seconds for the 100 m in 2011, but again suffered injuries.

Due to recurring injuries, Rose decided to stop competing and in 2012 he became a member of the coaching staff at Racers Track Club, the group containing Olympic and world champions Usain Bolt, Yohan Blake and Warren Weir. Turning away from his injury-ridden senior career, he instead set his sights on sharing his track and field knowledge with younger athletes.

Achievements

References
 

1987 births
Living people
Jamaican male sprinters
Athletes (track and field) at the 2010 Commonwealth Games
Commonwealth Games silver medallists for Jamaica
Commonwealth Games medallists in athletics
Medallists at the 2010 Commonwealth Games